Mammals are divided into two subclasses based on reproductive techniques: egg laying mammals (the monotremes), and live birth mammals.  The second subclass is divided into two infraclasses: pouched mammals (the marsupials) and placental mammals.

Australia is home to two of the five extant species of monotremes and the majority of the world's marsupials (the remainder are from Papua New Guinea, eastern Indonesia and the Americas).  The taxonomy is somewhat fluid; this list generally follows Menkhorst and Knight and Van Dyck and Strahan, with some input from the global list, which is derived from Gardner and Groves.

This is a sub-list of the list of mammals of Australia.

Conservation status listed follows the IUCN Red List of Threatened Species (v. 2013.2; data current at 5 March 2014):
 - extinct
 - extinct in the wild
 - critically endangered
 - endangered
 - vulnerable
 - near threatened
 - least concern
 - data deficient
 - not evaluated

Monotremata (monotremes)

Ornithorhynchidae

 Platypus, Ornithorhynchus anatinus

Tachyglossidae

 Short-beaked echidna, Tachyglossus aculeatus

Marsupialia (marsupials)

Dasyuromorphia (marsupial carnivores)

Thylacinidae

 Thylacine, Thylacinus cynocephalus  - extinct

Dasyuridae

 Tropical antechinus, Antechinus adustus 
 Agile antechinus, Antechinus agilis 
 Fawn antechinus, Antechinus bellus 
 Yellow-footed antechinus, Antechinus flavipes 
 Atherton antechinus, Antechinus godmani 
 Cinnamon antechinus, Antechinus leo 
 Swamp antechinus, Antechinus minimus 
 Brown antechinus, Antechinus stuartii 
 Subtropical antechinus, Antechinus subtropicus 
 Dusky antechinus, Antechinus swainsonii 
 Brush-tailed mulgara, Dasycercus blythi 
 Crest-tailed mulgara, Dasycercus cristicauda 
 Kaluta, Dasykaluta rosamondae 
 Kowari, Dasyuroides byrnei 
 Western quoll, Dasyurus geoffroii 
 Northern quoll, Dasyurus hallucatus 
 Tiger quoll, Dasyurus maculatus 
 Eastern quoll, Dasyurus viverrinus 
 Wongai ningaui, Ningaui ridei 
 Pilbara ningaui, Ningaui timealeyi 
 Mallee ningaui, Ningaui yvonneae 
 Dibbler, Parantechinus apicalis 
 Red-tailed phascogale, Phascogale calura 
 Brush-tailed phascogale, Phascogale tapoatafa 
 Brush-tailed phascogale, Phascogale (tapoatafa) pirata 
 Kultarr, Antechinomys laniger 
 Paucident planigale, Planigale gilesi 
 Long-tailed planigale, Planigale ingrami 
 Common planigale, Planigale maculata 
 Narrow-nosed planigale, Planigale tenuirostris 
 Sandstone false antechinus, Pseudantechinus bilarni 
 Fat-tailed false antechinus, Pseudantechinus macdonnellensis 
 Alexandria false antechinus, Pseudantechinus mimulus 
 Ningbing false antechinus, Pseudantechinus ningbing 
 Rory Cooper's false antechinus, Pseudantechinus roryi 
 Woolley's false antechinus, Pseudantechinus woolleyae 
 Tasmanian devil, Sarcophilus harrisii 
 Fat-tailed dunnart, Sminthopsis crassicaudata 
 Kakadu dunnart, Sminthopsis bindi 
 Carpentarian dunnart, Sminthopsis butleri 
 Julia Creek dunnart, Sminthopsis douglasi 
 Stripe-faced dunnart, Sminthopsis macroura 
 Red-cheeked dunnart, Sminthopsis virginiae 
 White-tailed dunnart, Sminthopsis granulipes 
 Kangaroo Island dunnart, Sminthopsis aitkeni 
 Grey-bellied dunnart, Sminthopsis griseoventer (including S. (griseoventer) boullangerensis)
 Boullanger Island dunnart, Sminthopsis boullangerensis (formerly S. griseoventer boullangerensis)
 Long-tailed dunnart, Sminthopsis longicaudata 
 Chestnut dunnart, Sminthopsis archeri 
 Little long-tailed dunnart, Sminthopsis dolichura 
 Sooty dunnart, Sminthopsis fuliginosus 
 Gilbert's dunnart, Sminthopsis gilberti 
 White-footed dunnart, Sminthopsis leucopus 
 Slender-tailed dunnart, Sminthopsis murina 
 Hairy-footed dunnart, Sminthopsis hirtipes 
 Ooldea dunnart, Sminthopsis ooldea 
 Sandhill dunnart, Sminthopsis psammophila 
 Lesser hairy-footed dunnart, Sminthopsis youngsoni

Myrmecobiidae

 Numbat, Myrmecobius fasciatus

Peramelemorphia (bandicoots, bilbies)

Chaeropodidae

 Pig-footed bandicoot, Chaeropus ecaudatus  - extinct

Peroryctidae

 Rufous spiny bandicoot, Echymipera rufescens

Peramelidae

 Golden bandicoot, Isoodon auratus 
 Northern brown bandicoot, Isoodon macrourus 
 Southern brown bandicoot, Isoodon obesulus 
 Western barred bandicoot, Perameles bougainville 
 Desert bandicoot, Perameles eremiana  - extinct
 Eastern barred bandicoot, Perameles gunnii 
 Long-nosed bandicoot, Perameles nasuta

Thylacomyidae

 Bilby, Macrotis lagotis 
 Lesser bilby, Macrotis leucura  - extinct

Notoryctemorphia (marsupial moles)

Notoryctidae

 Northern marsupial mole, Notoryctes caurinus 
 Southern marsupial mole, Notoryctes typhlops

Diprotodontia

Vombatiformes (wombats, koalas)

Vombatidae
 Northern hairy-nosed wombat, Lasiorhinus krefftii 
 Southern hairy-nosed wombat, Lasiorhinus latifrons 
 Common wombat, Vombatus ursinus

Phascolarctidae
 Koala, Phascolarctos cinereus

Phalangeriformes (possums, gliders)

Phalangeridae
 Southern common cuscus, Phalanger mimicus 
 Common spotted cuscus, Spilocuscus maculatus 
 Northern brushtail possum, Trichosurus arnhemensis
 Short-eared possum, Trichosurus caninus 
 Mountain brushtail possum, Trichosurus cunninghami 
 Common brushtail possum, Trichosurus vulpecula 
 Coppery brushtail possum, Trichosurus johnstonii
 Scaly-tailed possum, Wyulda squamicaudata

Burramyidae
 Mountain pygmy possum, Burramys parvus 
 Long-tailed pygmy possum, Cercartetus caudatus 
 Southwestern pygmy possum, Cercartetus concinnus 
 Tasmanian pygmy possum, Cercartetus lepidus 
 Eastern pygmy possum, Cercartetus nanus

Tarsipedidae
 Honey possum, Tarsipes rostratus

Petauridae
 Striped possum, Dactylopsila trivirgata 
 Leadbeater's possum, Gymnobelideus leadbeateri 
 Yellow-bellied glider, Petaurus australis 
 Sugar glider, Petaurus breviceps 
 Mahogany glider, Petaurus gracilis 
 Squirrel glider, Petaurus norfolcensis

Pseudocheiridae

 Lemuroid ringtail possum, Hemibelideus lemuroides 
 Greater glider, Petauroides volans 
 Rock ringtail possum, Petropseudes dahli 
 Common ringtail possum, Pseudocheirus peregrinus 
 Western ringtail possum, Pseudocheirus (peregrinus) occidentalis 
 Green ringtail possum, Pseudochirops archeri 
 Daintree River ringtail possum, Pseudochirulus cinereus 
 Herbert River ringtail possum, Pseudochirulus herbertensis

Acrobatidae
 Feathertail glider, Acrobates pygmaeus

Macropodiformes (kangaroos, wallabies)

Hypsiprymnodontidae
 Musky rat-kangaroo, Hypsiprymnodon moschatus

Potoroidae

 Rufous bettong, Aepyprymnus rufescens 
 Southern bettong, Bettongia gaimardi 
 Burrowing bettong, Bettongia lesueur 
 Woylie, Bettongia penicillata 
 Northern bettong, Bettongia tropica 
 Nullarbor dwarf bettong, Bettongia pusilla  - extinct
 Desert rat-kangaroo, Caloprymnus campestris  - extinct
 Gilbert's potoroo, Potorous gilbertii 
 Long-footed potoroo, Potorous longipes 
 Broad-faced potoroo, Potorous platyops  - extinct
 Long-nosed potoroo, Potorous tridactylus

Macropodidae

 Bennett's tree-kangaroo, Dendrolagus bennettianus 
 Lumholtz's tree-kangaroo, Dendrolagus lumholtzi 
 Central hare-wallaby, Lagorchestes asomatus  - extinct
 Spectacled hare-wallaby, Lagorchestes conspicillatus 
 Mala, Lagorchestes hirsutus 
 Eastern hare-wallaby, Lagorchestes leporides  - extinct
 Banded hare-wallaby, Lagostrophus fasciatus 
 Western grey kangaroo, Macropus fuliginosus 
 Eastern grey kangaroo, Macropus giganteus 
 Agile wallaby, Notamacropus agilis 
 Black-striped wallaby, Notamacropus dorsalis 
 Tammar wallaby, Notamacropus eugenii 
 Toolache wallaby, Notamacropus greyi  - extinct
 Western brush wallaby, Notamacropus irma 
 Parma wallaby, Notamacropus parma 
 Whiptail wallaby, Notamacropus parryi 
 Red-necked wallaby, Notamacropus rufogriseus 
 Bridled nail-tail wallaby, Onychogalea fraenata 
 Crescent nail-tail wallaby, Onychogalea lunata  - extinct
 Northern nail-tail wallaby, Onychogalea unguifera 
 Antilopine kangaroo, Osphranter antilopinus 
 Black wallaroo, Osphranter bernardus 
 Common wallaroo or euro, Osphranter robustus 
 Red kangaroo, Osphranter rufus 
 Allied rock-wallaby, Petrogale assimilis 
 Short-eared rock-wallaby, Petrogale brachyotis 
 Monjon, Petrogale burbidgei 
 Cape York rock-wallaby, Petrogale coenensis 
 Nabarlek, Petrogale concinna 
 Godman's rock-wallaby, Petrogale godmani 
 Herbert's rock-wallaby, Petrogale herberti 
 Unadorned rock-wallaby, Petrogale inornata 
 Black-flanked rock-wallaby, Petrogale lateralis 
 Purple-necked rock-wallaby, Petrogale purpureicollis 
 Mareeba rock-wallaby, Petrogale mareeba 
 Brush-tailed rock-wallaby, Petrogale penicillata 
 Proserpine rock-wallaby, Petrogale persephone 
 Rothschild's rock-wallaby, Petrogale rothschildi 
 Sharman's rock-wallaby, Petrogale sharmani 
 Yellow-footed rock-wallaby, Petrogale xanthopus 
 Quokka, Setonix brachyurus 
 Tasmanian pademelon, Thylogale billardierii 
 Red-legged pademelon, Thylogale stigmatica 
 Red-necked pademelon, Thylogale thetis 
 Swamp wallaby, Wallabia bicolor

See also
 List of mammals of Australia
 List of bats of Australia
 List of rodents of Australia
 List of placental mammals introduced to Australia
 List of marine mammals of Australia
Global list of monotremes and marsupials

References

External links 
 The IUCN Red List of Threatened Species

 
Monotremes and marsupials
List AU

ro:Listă de monotreme şi marsupiale